Marc Elrich (born November 2, 1949) is an American politician serving as the county executive of Montgomery County, Maryland. He is a former member of the Montgomery County Council and the Takoma Park City Council. He became the Democratic nominee for Montgomery County Executive in the 2018 primary before winning the general election.

Early life and career

Marc Elrich was born in Washington, D.C., near Takoma Park. His father was a postal worker and his mother was a waitress. When he was ten, his family moved to Silver Spring. In 1963, he went to hear Martin Luther King Jr. speak at the March on Washington. He attended Albert Einstein High School in Kensington and the University of Maryland. He was once arrested at an anti-apartheid rally. He worked as a manager in the automotive department at Montgomery Ward before getting a master's degree in teaching from Johns Hopkins University.

Elrich taught 4th and 5th grade for 17 years at Rolling Terrace Elementary.

Elrich was on the Takoma Park City Council for years.

Political career

Montgomery County Council
Elrich ran for the county council four times before getting elected in 2006. Since that time, he has served three terms. He was elected with the most votes of any candidate in 2010 and 2014. The Washington Post endorsed his candidacy in 2010 and 2014, stating that he was viewed as somewhat anti-business, but advocated a business-beneficial transit system and had a strong focus on efficiency and the development and planning process.

He worked to have environmental concerns addressed in the Clarksburg Master Plan and he spearheaded the effort to protect Tenmile Creek. The amendment that was passed requires development to supply environmental protections. He considered protecting the stream one of his highest environmental concerns at the time. He supported one bill protecting the tree canopy and sponsored another protecting street trees. Both were voted into law. He advocated for the elimination of cosmetic use of pesticides on private lawns because of their cancer-causing chemicals helping the county become the first locality in the country to do so and was considered a key co-sponsor of the legislation. He advocated against the use of artificial playing turfs that contain lead and other cancer-causing ingredients and sponsored a resolution banning crumb rubber turfs. He voted for the Montgomery county five-cent bag tax to fund environmental cleanup efforts. He was lead sponsor of a bill to require large gas stations to be at least 500 feet from schools and parks.

In 2013, Elrich was the lead sponsor of legislation to increase the county's minimum wage, which raised it to $11.50 per hour. Elrich twice was the lead sponsor of legislation to increase the minimum wage to $15 per hour in Montgomery County. In January 2017, a bill passed in the Council and was vetoed by then County Executive Ike Legget. In November 2017, a second bill passed and was signed into law, making Montgomery County the first county in Maryland with a $15 per hour minimum wage. At the time of the bill's passage, the State of Maryland's minimum wage was $9.25 per hour.

Elrich voted against the White Flint Mall II sector plan because Elrich stated that the plan would have created 6,000 residential units located too far from a Metro station. He voted against the Bethesda Master Plan because it failed to consider the effect the increased density would have on roads and schools. He voted against the Lyttonsville Sector Plan because he stated that it would increase housing costs and force residents to move out, as well as the Chevy Chase Lake Sector Plan. He opposed a proposal to sell land adjacent to the White Oak Food and Drug Administration campus because local roads and infrastructure were not equipped to handle additional traffic and students. In 1995, he joined with community members and fought against a proposed mega mall in downtown Silver Spring.

Montgomery County Executive 
In 2017, Elrich declared his candidacy for county executive. He participated in public financing. The largest allowed contribution is $150. He did not accept money from developers or land use attorneys.

In 2019, Elrich banned Montgomery County police stations from displaying thin blue line flags. Acknowledging that the flag was a symbol of "support" to some and a symbol of "divisiveness" to others, he drew criticism from Governor Larry Hogan for the policy.

Positions on housing 
Elrich has been a frequent critic of tax incentives for market-rate transit-oriented development. Elrich received criticism for describing the council's plan to allow denser housing construction around the stations of the proposed 16-mile Purple Line light rail train as "ethnic cleansing". Elrich had clarified the comment and defended the argument that rezoning can cause an increase in new construction values resulting in displaced communities and said that this is not just a Montgomery County problem but a nationwide problem and a "well-known fact" of what happens when rail lines take over communities.

During his tenure, Elrich has made efforts to preserve affordable housing. Elrich has opposed multiple development plans that would increase market-rate housing construction without meeting affordability requirements.  In 2019, Elrich critiqued a nonbinding council resolution to build 10,000 more housing units (most of them affordable housing) by 2030, stating that the projected number of low-paying jobs coming to the county was inaccurate. In 2020, Elrich vetoed a bill giving tax breaks to developers who built high-rise buildings on top of Metro stations, but the council overrode his veto. Elrich has frequently called for higher taxes on real estate developers.

Personal life

Elrich has four children. Two were foster children, including a son who has Down syndrome. He has lived in Takoma Park for most of his life. He is Jewish. On January 1, 2022 it was announced that he had tested positive for COVID-19.

2018 elections

Primary election results
The Democratic primary election was held on June 26, 2018.

General election results
The general election was held on November 6, 2018.

2022 elections

Primary election results
The Montgomery County executive primary election was held on July 19, 2022. On August 6, Elrich declared victory with a 42 vote lead over Blair, but Blair released a statement saying he would request a recount pursuant to Maryland law. Elrich ended up winning the recount by 32 votes.

General election results
The general election was held on Tuesday, November 8, 2022. Elrich defeated Montgomery County GOP chairman Reardon Sullivan.

References

External links

 
 Campaign website

1949 births
Montgomery County, Maryland Executives
Johns Hopkins University alumni
University of Maryland, College Park alumni
Maryland Democrats
Maryland city council members
Living people